The Kidnapper (Spanish: El secuestrador) is a 1958 Argentine drama film directed by Leopoldo Torre Nilsson and starring María Vaner, Leonardo Favio and Lautaro Murúa.

Cast

References

Bibliography 
 Michael Pigott & Santiago Oyarzabel. World Film Locations: Buenos Aires. Intellect Ltd, 2014.

External links 
 

1958 films
Argentine drama films
1958 drama films
1950s Spanish-language films
Films directed by Leopoldo Torre Nilsson
Films set in Buenos Aires
1950s Argentine films